Ivan Rondanini (born 10 April 1995) is an Italian football player.

Club career
He made his Serie C debut for Savona on 16 January 2016 in a game against Pontedera.

On 25 July 2019, he signed a 2-year contract with Padova.

On 18 September 2020, he joined Imolese.

References

External links
 

1995 births
Sportspeople from the Metropolitan City of Milan
Living people
Italian footballers
Association football defenders
Italy youth international footballers
Savona F.B.C. players
A.C.N. Siena 1904 players
Brescia Calcio players
U.S. Cremonese players
Calcio Padova players
Imolese Calcio 1919 players
Serie B players
Serie C players
Footballers from Lombardy